Claude Troisgros (born 9 April 1956) is a French chef who lives in Rio de Janeiro, Brazil. He is the son of the famous chef Pierre Troisgros, who with his brother Jean were among a group of French chefs who pioneered nouvelle cuisine in the 1970s, influenced by Fernand Point.

Career 
Claude Troisgros runs four restaurants in Rio de Janeiro, Olympe and 66 Bistrô, CT Brasserie and CT Boucherie. In the US, he was part-owner of the restaurant Caviar & Banana in New York City, and he is Executive Chef/Consultant at Blue Door Restaurant at the Delano Hotel in Miami. 66 Bistrô was recently closed in order to open another CT Boucherie location.

Troisgros is a celebrity chef in Brazil, where he presents his own TV show Que Marravilha! on the GNT cable channel. The TV show has a magazine format, with recipes, reality show features, and travelogue pieces.

Filmography

See also
 Troisgros family

References

Living people
French chefs
French emigrants to Brazil
Brazilian chefs
1956 births